Laburnum, sometimes called golden chain or golden rain, is a genus of two species of small trees in the subfamily Faboideae of the pea family Fabaceae. The species are Laburnum anagyroides—common laburnum and Laburnum alpinum—alpine laburnum. They are native to the mountains of southern Europe from France to the Balkans.

Some botanists include a third species, Laburnum caramanicum, but this native of southeast Europe and Anatolia is usually treated in a distinct genus Podocytisus, more closely allied to the Genisteae (brooms).

Description
The Laburnum trees are deciduous.

The fruit develops as a pod and is extremely poisonous.

The yellow flowers are responsible for the old poetic name 'golden chain tree' (also written as golden chaintree or goldenchain tree).

All parts of the plant are poisonous, although mortality is very rare. Symptoms of laburnum poisoning may include intense sleepiness, vomiting, convulsive movements, coma, slight frothing at the mouth and unequally dilated pupils. In some cases, diarrhea is very severe, and at times the convulsions are markedly tetanic. The main toxin in the plant is cytisine, a nicotinic receptor agonist.

It is used as a food plant by the larvae of some Lepidoptera species, including the Palearctic moth, the buff-tip.

Species

Accepted binomials
Laburnum comprises the following species:
 Laburnum alpinum (Mill.) Bercht. & J. Presl
 Laburnum anagyroides Medik.

Species names with uncertain taxonomic status
The status of the following species is unresolved:

 Laburnum album J.Presl
 Laburnum arboreum J.Presl
 Laburnum biflorum G.Nicholson
 Laburnum fragrans Griseb.
 Laburnum grandiflorum (DC.) J.Presl
 Laburnum heuffelii Wierzb. ex Fuss
 Laburnum ianigerum J. Presl
 Laburnum intermedium Dippel
 Laburnum jacquinianum Dalla Torre & Sarnth.
 Laburnum jaquinianum Dieck
 Laburnum laburnum (L.) Voss
 Laburnum laburnum Dörfl.
 Laburnum lanigerum J.Presl
 Laburnum linneanum Dieck
 Laburnum monadelphum Pritz.
 Laburnum nigricans J.Presl
 Laburnum nigricanum Fuss
 Laburnum nubigenum J.Presl
 Laburnum patens J.Presl
 Laburnum pendulum Raf.
 Laburnum praecox Fuss
 Laburnum purpurascens hort. & Vilm.
 Laburnum purpureum (Scop.) Drapiez
 Laburnum ramentaceum (Sieber) K.Koch
 Laburnum rochelii Wierzb. ex Fuss
 Laburnum serotinum Hort. ex Dippel
 Laburnum sessilifolium J.Presl
 Laburnum spinosum J.Presl
 Laburnum tardiflorum auct.
 Laburnum triflorum J.Presl
 Laburnum variabile hort. & Vilm.
 Laburnum weldeni Griseb. ex Lavall.
 Laburnum weldenii Griseb. ex Lavallée

Hybrids
The following hybrids have been described:
 Laburnum × watereri (Wettst.) Dippel (L. alpinum × L. anagyroides)

There is also a graft-chimaera, + Laburnocytisus 'Adamii' Lavallée.

Uses

Woodworking
Laburnum has historically been used for cabinetmaking and inlay, as well as for musical instruments. In addition to such wind instruments as recorders and flutes, it was a popular wood for Great Highland Bagpipes before taste turned to imported dense tropical hardwoods such as Brya ebenus (cocus wood), ebony, and Dalbergia melanoxylon (African monkeywood). The heart-wood of a laburnum may be used as a substitute for ebony or rosewood. It is very hard and a dark chocolate brown, with a butter-yellow sapwood.

Cultivation
Laburnum species and hybrids are cultivated as ornamental trees for gardens and parks. They are also trained as espaliers on pergolas, for ceilings of pendant flowers in season. In its natural form, Laburnum is a shrubby, multi-branched tree, but it is often pruned to maintain a single trunk which displays the smooth green bark.

Gardeners are advised to remove the spent seedpods after flowering because they sap the strength of the tree and are the most poisonous part. Generally Laburnum does not perform well in hot climates, and has a reduced life-span if grown in climates with warm winters. Afternoon shade and the occasional deep watering are advisable in areas with hot, dry summers. They do best in climates with moderate winter and summer temperatures, ideally Oceanic climates like those of the Pacific Northwest and Northern Europe. Laburnum trees are ubiquitous in England, Wales, Scotland and Ireland, where they are commonly planted as lawn specimens or in shrub borders.

Most garden specimens are of the hybrid between the two species, Laburnum ×watereri 'Vossii' (Voss's laburnum), which combines the longer racemes of L. alpinum with the denser flowers of L. anagyroides; it also has the benefit of low seed production. It has gained the Royal Horticultural Society's Award of Garden Merit.

References

External links
 Flora Europaea: Laburnum
 ILDIS Legume Database
 Laburnum tree video — time lapse of a year in the life of a Laburnum tree.
 Grieve, 'A Modern Herbal' (1931)

Genisteae
Fabaceae genera
Trees of Europe
Flora of Europe
Flora of Italy
Garden plants of Europe
Ornamental trees